The 2018 Dervish protests, which occurred in February and March 2018 in Tehran, led to clashes between security forces, and Dervishes, an Iranian Sufi group (Gonabadi Dervishes), protesting against the government, resulting in the bloody repression of protestors. Tensions between Police, the IRGC, and the Basij with a number of Gonabadi Dervishes eventually led to the deaths of six people, the execution of Dervishes, and the arrest of hundreds of wounded Dervishes on March.

The United States called the repression of the Dervishes the largest repression of religious minorities in the Islamic Republic, while the Ministry of Interior of Iran called the protests a plot to expand its scope to the national level by creating regional unrest.

Background
The Gonabadi Dervishes are Sufi Muslims; the Iranian government considers them a threat. Conversion to Sufism is frowned upon by the Shi'a religious establishment.

In January 2012, at least 10 of the group's members were imprisoned in Fars province, and others may be held at Evin Prison in Tehran, including Kasra Nouri

Protests
On 19 February, the Sufis organized a sit-in protest at a police station, located in the Pasdaran district of Tehran, where one of their members was held. Later, clashes broke out between the Sufi protestors and security forces. Police used tear gas in an attempt to disperse the protesters. Five riot police were killed. 

According to the Iranian press, police arrested around 300 people, and there have been reports that some of the protesters may have been killed. However, the Sufi dervishes gathered around the home of their 90-year-old leader Noor Ali Tabandeh to protect him from arrest. 

In the aftermath of the 19 February, protests, footage emerged that showed several Sufi protesters who were arrested, being tortured by government forces.

On 4 March, it was revealed that one of the protesters had died under the custody of the Iranian government.

See also 
 Noor Ali Tabandeh
 Kasra Nouri

References

2017–2018 Iranian protests
Dervish
Protest marches
Dervish
2018 in Iran
February 2018 events in Iran
March 2018 events in Iran
Persecution of Muslims